Tiara Tahiti is a 1962 comedy-drama film directed by Ted Kotcheff and starring James Mason and John Mills. Kotcheff's directorial debut, it is based on the novel by Geoffrey Cotterell, who also adapted it for the screen with Ivan Foxwell. It was filmed in London and Tahiti. Rosenda Monteros, a Mexican actress, plays a Tahitian beauty. Roy Kinnear had a minor role.

Plot
Clifford Southey (Mills) is a clerk at a brokerage firm who is promoted to lieutenant colonel during the war.  His subordinate officer, Captain Brett Aimsley (Mason), was a partner at Southey's firm.  Popular and charismatic, Capt. Aimsley is everything Col. Southey is not, but aspires to be.  Unfortunately money is Aimsley's weakness. His profligacy sees him removed from Southey's command.

Some time after the war, Aimsley's comfortable exile in Tahiti is rudely interrupted by the arrival of his old adversary, now director of a hotel chain looking to expand into the burgeoning South Seas market.

Cast
 James Mason as Aimsley
 John Mills as Southey
 Herbert Lom as Chong Sing
 Rosenda Monteros as Belle Annie
 Claude Dauphin as Henry
 Roy Kinnear as Enderby

Critical reception
In The New York Times, Bosley Crowther called it "lush, foolish, sometimes funny...splotchy entertainment that is, at least, colorful"; while Variety wrote "The two male stars in this pic have a field day. Mason is fine as the mocking wastrel while Mills is equally good in a more difficult role that could have lapsed into parody. These two carry the main burden of the film" whereas Time Out found it an "uneven mix of character study and situation comedy".

Box Office
According to Kinematograph Weekly the film was considered a "money maker" at the British box office in 1962.

References

External links

1962 films
1962 comedy-drama films
British comedy-drama films
Films based on British novels
Films directed by Ted Kotcheff
Films set in French Polynesia
Films shot in Tahiti
British independent films
Tahitian culture
Films shot at Pinewood Studios
1962 directorial debut films
1962 independent films
1960s English-language films
1960s British films